| player              = 
| prevseason          = Apertura 2017
| nextseason          = Apertura 2018
}}

The Clausura 2018 Copa MX (officially the Clausura 2018 Copa Corona MX for sponsorship reasons) was the 79th staging of the Copa MX, the 51st staging in the professional era and is the twelfth tournament played since the 1996–97 edition.

The tournament began on 9 January 2018 and ended on 11 April 2018. 

The final was held at Estadio Victoria in Aguascalientes City, with the home team Necaxa defeating Toluca 1–0 to win their fourth title.

As winners, Necaxa earned a spot to face Monterrey (winners of Apertura 2017 edition), in the 2018 Supercopa MX.

Participants
This tournament featured the 14 clubs from Liga MX who did not participate in the 2018 CONCACAF Champions League (América, Guadalajara, Tijuana and UANL).

The tournament also featured the top 13 Ascenso MX teams of the Apertura 2017 classification table.

Draw
The draw for the tournament took place on 22 December 2017. 27 teams were drawn into nine groups of three, with each group containing one team from each of the three pots.

Clubs in Pot 1 were drawn to be the seed of each group according to the order of their drawing. That is, the first club that was drawn is seed of Group 1, the second drawn is seed of Group 2 and so on and so on. The Liga MX teams in Pot 1 are the four best teams in the Apertura 2017 classification table not participating in the 2018 CONCACAF Champions League as well as the defending champion. Due to the defending champion Monterrey already being one the four best teams in the Apertura 2017 classification table, León, who was the fifth best placed team in the table, was also drawn into Pot 1. Pot 1 also contained the top three Ascenso MX teams in the Apertura 2017 classification table 

Pot 2 contains the next four best Liga MX clubs in the Apertura 2017 classification table not participating in the 2018 CONCACAF Champions League. Pot 2 also contains the Ascenso MX clubs who ended 5–9 in the Apertura 2017 classification table.

Pot 3 contains the next five best Liga MX clubs in the Apertura 2017 classification table not participating in the 2018 CONCACAF Champions League. Pot 3 also contains the Ascenso MX clubs who ended 10–13 in the Apertura 2017 classification table.

Teams

Tiebreakers
If two or more clubs are equal on points on completion of the group matches, the following criteria are applied to determine the rankings:

 scores of the group matches played among the clubs in question;
 superior goal difference;
 higher number of goals scored away in the group matches played among the clubs in question;
 higher number of goals scored;
 fair play ranking;
 drawing of lots.

Group stage
Every group is composed of three clubs, each group has at least one club from Liga MX and Ascenso MX

Group 1

Group 2

Group 3

Group 4

Group 5

Group 6

Group 7

Group 8

Group 9

Ranking of second-placed teams

Knockout stage
The clubs that advance to this stage will be ranked and seeded 1 to 16 based on performance in the group stage. In case of ties, the same tiebreakers used to rank the runners-up will be used.
All rounds are played in a single game. If a game ends in a draw, it will proceed directly to a penalty shoot-out. The highest seeded club will host each match, regardless of which division each club belongs. 
The winners of the groups and the seven best second place teams of each group will advance to the Knockout stage.

Qualified teams
The nine group winners and the seven best runners-up from the group stage qualify for the final stage.

Seeding

Bracket

Round of 16

Quarterfinals

Semifinals

Final

Top goalscorers
Players sorted first by goals scored, then by last name.

Source: Copa MX

References

External links
Official site

2018, 1
Copa Mx, 1
Copa Mx, 1